Cyanotis tuberosa, is a species of plants in the Commelinaceae family.

References 

tuberosa